Mel Tormé and the Marty Paich Dektette – In Concert Tokyo is a 1988 live album by the American jazz singer Mel Tormé, accompanied by a big band arranged and led by Marty Paich.

Track listing
"It Don't Mean a Thing (If It Ain't Got That Swing)" (Duke Ellington)
"Sweet Georgia Brown" (Ben Bernie, Kenneth Casey, Maceo Pinkard)
"Just in Time" (Betty Comden, Adolph Green, Jule Styne)
"When the Sun Comes Out" (Harold Arlen, Ted Koehler)
"Carioca" (Edward Eliscu, Gus Kahn, Vincent Youmans)
"More Than You Know" (Eliscu, Rose, Youmans)
"Too Close for Comfort" (Jerry Bock, Larry Holofcener, George David Weiss)
"The City" (Arthur Hamilton)	
"The Gift"/"One Note Samba"/"How Insensitive" (Antônio Carlos Jobim)/(Jobim, Newton Mendonça)/(Jobim, Vinícius de Moraes, Norman Gimbel)
"On the Street Where You Live" (Alan Jay Lerner, Frederick Loewe)
"Cotton Tail" (Ellington)
"The Christmas Song" (Mel Tormé, Robert Wells)

Personnel 
 Mel Tormé - vocals, drums
 Warren Luening - trumpet
 Jack Sheldon
 Dan Barrett - trombone
 Chuck Berghofer - double bass
 Bob Efford - baritone saxophone
 Bob Enevoldsen - valve trombone
 Allen Farnham - piano
 Gary Foster - alto saxophone
 Marty Paich - arranger, conductor
 Ken Peplowski - clarinet, tenor saxophone
 Jim Self - tuba
 John Von Ohlen - drums

References

Mel Tormé live albums
Albums arranged by Marty Paich
albums produced by Carl Jefferson
1988 live albums
Concord Records live albums